Juho Vennola's second cabinet was the sixth Government of Republic of Finland. Cabinet's time period was April 9, 1921 – June 2, 1922. It was a minority government. Minister of the Interior Heikki Ritavuori was assassinated in Helsinki February 14, 1922 in front of his home door. This was the only assassination in the history of independent Finland.
 

Vennola, 2
1921 establishments in Finland
1922 disestablishments in Finland
Cabinets established in 1921
Cabinets disestablished in 1922